Feurich (Feurich Pianoforte GmbH) is a piano company founded in 1851 in Leipzig, Germany, by Julius Gustav Feurich, which has been family operated for five generations. The company is renowned for the quality of its pianos. 

Since 2011, Feurich has been owned by the Austrian piano manufacturer formerly known as Wendl & Lung, and the bulk of its manufacturing is carried out in China, except for the upright piano 123 – Vienna, which is manufactured in Vienna, Austria. In 2021, Feurich - Wendl&Lung GmbH was renamed Feurich Pianoforte GmbH.

History

Artisanal piano making has a long tradition in Saxony. The city of Leipzig was, along with Paris, London, and Vienna, one of the pillars of European musical culture and music capital of the German Empire. In addition to its great cultural heritage, the city of Leipzig was also an excellent trading venue with a lot of national contacts and a prosperous middle class. Here Julius Gustav Feurich founded the piano factory, Feurich, in 1851.

By 1860, more than 400 instruments were manufactured and sold. Julius Feurich worked to expand his business and in the following years a larger and more modern factory was built allowing for ever greater quantities to be produced. By the turn of the twentieth century, nearly 14,000 uprights and grand pianos were manufactured.

The owner Hermann Feurich was awarded an imperial and royal warrant of appointment to the court of Austria-Hungary.

Feurich was one of the greatest German piano companies, but had the bad luck to be located in a major city that was bombed heavily during World War II and the factory was destroyed. It then had the further misfortune to be in East Germany, behind the Iron Curtain, during Germany's partition which caused exports to go to nearly zero. The factory was re-located to the outskirts of Gunzenhausen (West Germany) in 1959.

In 2011, Feurich was sold to Wendl & Lung, similar to Feurich's and their successor firm a traditional piano manufacturer based in Vienna, Austria. Wendl & Lung picked up Feurich pianos again, based on the same constructions as before. Wendl & Lung models were also renamed as Feurich. 

Today, Feurich grand pianos and upright pianos are produced at Hailun Piano Company factory in Ningbo, China with the exception of the upright piano 123 – Vienna made in Vienna, Austria.

Current Grand Piano Models

Current Upright Piano Models

References

External links
Feurich website

Manufacturing companies based in Leipzig
German brands
Piano manufacturing companies of Germany
Piano manufacturing companies of Austria
Musical instrument manufacturing companies based in Vienna
Purveyors to the Imperial and Royal Court
Music in Leipzig